William Tomlinson was a cricketer.

William Tomlinson may also refer to:

Sir William Tomlinson, 1st Baronet (1838–1912), English lawyer, colliery owner and Conservative politician
William Rae Tomlinson (1902–1979), Liberal party member of the Canadian House of Commons
William Weaver Tomlinson (1858–1916), historian
Bill Tomlinson, informatics researcher
Bill Tomlinson (footballer) (1927–2000), Australian rules footballer
Will Tomlinson (born 1986), boxer